The United Liberal National Party (Miatsyal Azatakan Azgayin Kusaktsutyun), also  known by its Armenian initials (MIAK), is an Armenian national liberal political party established in 2007 and headquartered in Yerevan, Armenia. Co-founder Levon Martirosyan was elected as an MP from the Republican Party of Armenia in 2012.

Ideology
The party maintains a centre-right political position. It advocates for the peaceful resolution to the Nagorno-Karabakh conflict, fighting against domestic corruption, strengthening Armenia's democracy, liberalization of the economy, deepening progress towards Armenia’s European integration and maintaining positive relations with the EU, the United States, Russia, Iran and Georgia.

Parliamentary elections
Having announced the goal to present a political presence and form a new political agenda through the election process, MIAK conducted its pre-election campaign by presenting a fundamental reforms program. Their agenda was included within former President Serge Sargsyan's pre-election program.

Following the 2007 Armenian parliamentary election, the party won just 0.20% of the popular vote. Following the election campaign, although MIAK did not collect enough votes necessary to gain representation in the National Assembly of Armenia, the party and its youth-wing, were able to achieve a political presence. As a result, the President of Armenia, Serge Sargsyan, appointed a number of young professionals from MIAK in the public administration system of Armenia.

MIAK was very active during the 2008 Armenian presidential election and party volunteers campaigned door-to-door. This entailed nearly 300 MIAK activists visiting more than 240,000 apartments in the capital Yerevan and presenting their views supporting Serzh Sargsyan for presidency.

The party currently has no representation in the National Assembly and did not participate in the 2018 Armenian parliamentary election.

Youth 
MIAK is mainly composed of young people, who cooperate with and support numerous youth and student organizations in implementing different projects, initiatives and ideas. Through this cooperation, the MIASIN (Together) youth movement was created.

Membership 
Any Armenian citizen 18 years old and above, who accepts the MIAK Charter, can voluntarily become a MIAK member. Already registered MIAK members cannot be a member of any other political party.

See also

Politics of Armenia
Programs of political parties in Armenia

References

External links
Miak- United Liberal National Party  official site

2007 establishments in Armenia
Political parties in Armenia
National liberal parties
Nationalist parties in Armenia
Political parties established in 2007
Pro-European political parties in Armenia
Liberal parties in Armenia